The Puente de los Franceses (Bridge of the Frenchmen) railway viaduct is located in Madrid, Spain. Comprising five semi-circular brick skew arches, it was built in the second half of the 19th century to carry the railway line from the north (Madrid - Venta de Baños - Irun) across the River Manzanares.

Toponymy 

The bridge is named after the nationality of the engineers who devised the project, who were of French origin. The bridge is also known as the French Bridge.

History 

The bridge was built between 1860 and 1862, along with other construction work on the railway line to the north, which began in 1856, by the Compañía de los Caminos de Hierro del Norte de España.

References 

Bridges in Madrid
Crossings of the River Manzanares
Arch bridges
Skew bridges